The 2017 Fordham Rams men's soccer team represented Fordham University during the 2017 NCAA Division I men's soccer season. It was the 66th season of the program's existence and their 23rd in the Atlantic 10 Conference. The Rams played their home matches at Coffey Field in The Bronx.

The season was the program's most successful season in the NCAA Division I Men's Soccer Championship. The Rams advanced to the Round of 16 in the tournament for the first time in program history, as well as their first ever quarterfinal appearance. This came after securing their first ever at-large berth in the tournament. It was only the fourth time in program history that the Rams qualified for the NCAA Tournament. On the way to the Round of 16, Fordham secured a come-from-behind victory over St. Francis Brooklyn and five-time NCAA champions, Virginia. In the quarterfinal round, Fordham lost to the third-seeded North Carolina.

Squad 

As of November 20, 2017.

Schedule 

|-
!colspan=8 style=""| Preseason

|-
!colspan=8 style=""| Non-conference regular season
|-

|-
!colspan=8 style=""| Atlantic 10 regular season
|-

|-
!colspan=8 style=""| Atlantic 10 Tournament
|-

|-
!colspan=8 style=""| NCAA Tournament
|-

Appearances and goals
Source:

Numbers in parentheses denote appearances as substitute.
Players listed with no appearances have been in the matchday squad but only as unused substitutes.
Key to positions: GK – Goalkeeper; DF – Defender; MF – Midfielder; FW – Forward

References 

Fordham Rams men's soccer seasons
Fordham Rams
Fordham Rams
Fordham Rams
Fordham Rams